John Christopher Wilson (born 28 October 1934) was an English professional footballer who played in the Football League as a full back.

References

External links

1934 births
Living people
Footballers from Norwich
English footballers
Association football defenders
Norwich City F.C. players
Chesterfield F.C. players
King's Lynn F.C. players
English Football League players